Ted Perlman (born November 21, 1953) is an American musician, record producer, songwriter, and arranger.  He has produced, arranged, recorded, and toured with major artists Whitney Houston, Harry Belafonte, Bob Dylan, Diana Ross, Burt Bacharach, Ronald Isley, Alessandra Rosaldo, The Manhattans, Blush, Ringo Starr, Joe Cocker, Chicago, and Young MC.

Early life and career
Perlman was born in Brooklyn, New York.

References

External links
 

1953 births
Living people
Songwriters from New York (state)
Record producers from New York (state)
American pop guitarists
People from Brooklyn